The Autumn Miss Stakes is a Grade III American Thoroughbred horse race for fillies that are three years old, over a distance of one mile on the turf track held annually in October at Santa Anita Park, Arcadia, California.  The event currently carries a purse of $100,000.

History

The inaugural running of the event as part of the Oak Tree Racing Association fall meeting at Santa Anita Park was on 10 October 1981 as the Yankee Valor Handicap for three-year-olds and older over a distance of  miles  on the dirt and was won by Rogers Red Top Farm's Shamgo who ridden by US Hall of Fame jockey Laffit Pincay Jr. finishing fast to win by a neck over Major Sport in a time of 1:42.80. The event was not held the following year.

In 1985 the three-year-old filly Fran's Valentine, winner of the Kentucky Oaks that year won the event defeating her male counterparts in her preparation for the Breeders' Cup. In 1986 the distance of the event was increased to  miles and attracted several horses who were aiming for the Breeders' Cup which was held at Santa Anita Park. This included 1985 Breeders' Cup Sprint winner Precisionist who won the race by an emphatic  lengths over Garthorn and 1985 Breeders' Cup Juvenile winner Tasso. Precisionist finished third in the Breeders' Cup Classic to Skywalker.

In 1987 the distance was reverted back to  miles.
 
In 1989 the event was renamed the Harold C. Ramser Sr. Handicap after Harold C. Ramser (3 February 1908 – 15 May 1989) who was a prominent businessman involved in Republican politics in California and horse racing aficionado. The same year the American Graded Stakes Committee upgraded the event to Grade III classification.

After not being held in 1990 the Oak Tree Racing Association changed the conditions of the event to a turf race for three-year-old fillies over a distance of a mile. The event was not stable by not being held continuously every season and lost its graded status in 1993.

In 2002, the race was run in two divisions.

In 2008 the event regained its Grade III status. In 2010 the event was held at Hollywood Park when the Oak Tree Racing Association held their meeting that year.

After the Oak Tree Racing Association ceased holding their meeting at Santa Anita the event was renamed to its present title Autumn Miss Stakes.

Records
Speed  record: 
1 mile (turf): 1:32.66 Lull (2017)
  miles (dirt): 1:40.60 Present Value (1989)

Margins 
  lengths: Precisionist (1986)

Most wins by a jockey:
 3 - Pat Valenzuela (1985, 2002, 2003)
 3 - Gary Stevens (1986, 1998, 2004)
 3 - Kent J. Desormeaux (1995, 2000, 2015)
 3 - Flavien Prat (2017, 2018, 2020)

Most wins by a trainer:
 2 - Wayne Charlton (1983, 1984)
 2 - Ron McAnally (1999, 2004)
 2 - Robert Frankel (2002, 2005)
 2 - Neil D. Drysdale (2006, 2018)
 2 - Craig A. Lewis (2003, 2020)
 2 - Philip D'Amato (2021, 2022)

Most wins by an owner:
 2 - Brent W. Charlton (1983, 1984)
 2 - The Thoroughbred Corporation (1998, 2002)

Winners

Legend:

 
 

Notes:

§ Ran as an entry

ƒ Filly or Mare

† In the 1983 running of the event Water Bank finished first but was disqualified for brushing Pettrax in the stretch run and set back to second.

See also
List of American and Canadian Graded races

External links
 Santa Anita Park 2021 Fall Media Guide

References

Horse races in California
Santa Anita Park
Flat horse races for three-year-old fillies
Open mile category horse races
Graded stakes races in the United States
Grade 3 stakes races in the United States
Turf races in the United States
Recurring sporting events established in 1981